The Hoboken mayoral election of 2021 was an election to determine who will hold the office of Mayor of Hoboken, New Jersey, in the upcoming term of 2022–2026. The election took place on November 2, 2022. Incumbent Mayor Ravinder Bhalla announced that he would seek reelection for a second term on June 3, 2021. Since there were no opponents, Bhalla ran unopposed for reelection for a second term.

Candidates
Incumbent Mayor Ravinder Bhalla, was the only person who declared his candidacy for the election. Despite this, Councilmembers Ruben Ramos Jr., Tiffanie Fisher, and Michael Russo as well as former Mayors Dawn Zimmer and David Roberts received write-in votes for mayor.

Results

References

Hoboken mayoral
Hoboken
Hoboken, New Jersey
Mayoral elections in Hoboken, New Jersey